Zhou Xin (born December 30, 1988) is an American table tennis player. He qualified to represent Team USA in the 2020 Tokyo Summer Olympics, competing on the Men's team alongside Nikhil Kumar. The duo were defeated by Swedish Anton Källberg and Kristian Karlsson.

References 

1988 births
Living people
American male table tennis players
Olympic table tennis players of the United States
Table tennis players at the 2020 Summer Olympics
21st-century American people